The qualification for the 2008 Men's Olympic Volleyball Tournament was held from 1 September 2007 to 8 June 2008.

Means of qualification

Host country
FIVB reserved a vacancy for the 2008 Summer Olympics host country to participate in the tournament.

2007 World Cup

Venues: 
Dates: 18 November – 2 December 2007
The top three teams qualified for the 2008 Summer Olympics.

Continental qualification tournaments

Africa

Venue:  Tongaat Hall, Durban, South Africa
Dates: 3–9 February 2008
The winners qualified for the 2008 Summer Olympics. The runners-up qualified for the 2008 World Olympic Qualification Tournaments.

Asia and Oceania
The 2008 Asian Olympic Qualification Tournament combined with 2008 3rd World Olympic Qualification Tournament. The hosts Japan and the top four ranked teams except Japan from the 2007 Asian Championship competed in the tournament. The top ranked among the five teams except the 2008 3rd World Olympic Qualification Tournament winners qualified for the 2008 Summer Olympics as the 2008 Asian Olympic Qualification Tournament winners.

Europe

Venue:  Halkapınar Sport Hall, İzmir, Turkey
Dates: 7–13 January 2008
The winners qualified for the 2008 Summer Olympics.

North America

Venue:  Coliseo Héctor Solá Bezares, Caguas, Puerto Rico
Dates: 6–11 January 2008
The winners qualified for the 2008 Summer Olympics. The second and third ranked teams qualified for the 2008 World Olympic Qualification Tournaments.

South America
Venue:  Estadio Cincuentenario, Formosa, Argentina
Dates: 3–7 January 2008
All times are Argentina Time (UTC−03:00).
The winners qualified for the 2008 Summer Olympics. The runners-up qualified for the 2008 World Olympic Qualification Tournaments.

|}

|}

World qualification tournaments
Qualified teams
Hosts

Qualified through the 2007 Asian Championship.
 *
 *
 *
 *

Qualified through the Continental Olympic Qualification Tournament or the FIVB World Ranking as of 3 December 2007.
 (as African Olympic Qualification Tournament 2nd place)
 (as World Ranking for European Team 1st place)
 (as World Ranking for European Team 2nd place)
 (as World Ranking for European Team 3rd place)
 (as North American Olympic Qualification Tournament 2nd place)
 (as North American Olympic Qualification Tournament 3rd place)
 (as South American Olympic Qualification Tournament 2nd place)

* The top four teams from 2007 Asian Championship were predetermined to be in 3rd tournament in Japan.

1st tournament
Venue:  ISS Dome, Düsseldorf, Germany
Dates: 23–25 May 2008
All times are Central European Summer Time (UTC+02:00).
The winners qualified for the 2008 Summer Olympics.

|}

|}

2nd tournament
Venue:  Nave Municipal de Espinho, Espinho, Portugal
Dates: 30 May – 1 June 2008
All times are Western European Summer Time (UTC+01:00).
The winners qualified for the 2008 Summer Olympics.

|}

|}

3rd tournament
Venue:  Tokyo Metropolitan Gymnasium, Tokyo, Japan
Dates: 31 May – 8 June 2008
All times are Japan Standard Time (UTC+09:00).
The winners and the best Asian team except the winners qualified for the 2008 Summer Olympics.

|}

|}

External links
Results of the 2008 African Olympic Qualification Tournament at Todor66.com
Official website of the 2008 European Olympic Qualification Tournament
Results of the 2008 North American Olympic Qualification Tournament at Todor66.com
Results of the 2008 South American Olympic Qualification Tournament at FEVA.org
Official website of the 2008 1st World Olympic Qualification Tournament
Official website of the 2008 2nd World Olympic Qualification Tournament
Official website of the 2008 3rd World Olympic Qualification Tournament

Olympic Qualification Men
2008